Woollahra Public School, (previously known as Woollahra Demonstration School), is a main school located in the eastern suburbs of Sydney, Australia, in the suburb of Woollahra, near Edgecliff.

Description
Though accepting students from Kindergarten to Year 6, Woollahra Public has for some time offered education for selected students in the academic area. These are called opportunity classes. Each Opportunity Class holds 30 students.

Woollahra Public is one of the oldest public schools in Sydney, having opened in 1878. It was designed by W. Kemp and J. Wigram, and is listed on the Register of the National Estate. It celebrated its centenary in 1978 and a time capsule was buried in the grounds.

History

Woollahra Public School was formally opened in 1879 with 300 children enrolled into three rooms. In 1891, extensions to the building were completed, and the enrolment was 1200. The school was changed to Woollahra Superior Public School to cater for the older and more senior students.

Since the 1930s, Woollahra has offered the Opportunity (OC) classes, catering for intellectually gifted children in the Eastern Suburbs. In 1961, due to their contribution to teacher education, the school's name was changed to Woollahra Demonstration School, but was changed back to Woollahra Public School as the Alexander Mackie Teachers College moved to Oatley in 1979, detaching their teaching program with the school's.

In 1978, a mural was painted on the old School Hall, featuring Central Australia's Olga Mountains, to celebrate its centenary.

Notable alumni

 Deni Hines - musician and actor
 Glenn Fraser - filmmaker
 Lana Cantrell - singer
 Stephen Duckett - health service manager and academic
 Justine Clarke - actor and musician
 Mouche Phillips - actor
 Anna Katzmann - judge.
 Sir John L. Carrick - WWII military officer and politician

References

Public primary schools in Sydney
Educational institutions established in 1879
1879 establishments in Australia
Woollahra, New South Wales
School buildings completed in 1879